The Journal of Air Law and Commerce, founded as the Journal of Air Law, is a peer reviewed academic journal of aviation law published by Southern Methodist University (SMU) in conjunction with the university's Dedman School of Law.

History
The intention to publish the journal was announced by the Law Institute in 1929. It was to be dedicated to air law, aeronautical law, air property law and radio law, and compared with other international air journals including the French Droit Aerien, the German Zeitschrift fur das Luftrecht and the Italian II Diritto Aronautica.

The journal was established by Fred Dow Fagg at Northwestern University in 1930 and was associated with that university's Air Law Institute. He remained its editor-in-chief until 1937. After the subject of air law became less popular, however, the Institute suffered from a lack of funding that caused it to wither leaving the journal as its principal activity. The journal was not published between October 1942 and January 1947. In 1961 it moved to Southern Methodist University from where it is still published.

The creation of the journal resulted in Fagg receiving the Federal Aviation Administration's Distinguished Service Award in 1976.

Activities
The journal holds an annual symposium in conjunction with SMU's Dedman School of Law.

References 

Law journals
Publications established in 1930
Southern Methodist University
Quarterly journals
Aviation law